Gloria Ha (born 2002) is a female international Hong Kong Chinese lawn bowler.

Bowls career
Ha made her debut for Hong Kong in 2015 and won a bronze medal in the fours with Angel So, Phyllis Wong and Cheryl Chan at the 2019 Asia Pacific Bowls Championships, held in the Gold Coast, Queensland.

At the age of just 14 she was selected for Hong Kong at the 2016 World Outdoor Bowls Championship in New Zealand. In 2022, Ha won a silver medal at the inaugural World Bowls Indoor Championships in the singles, she was defeated in the final by Julie Forrest.

References

Chinese bowls players
Hong Kong female bowls players
Living people
2002 births